The 1968 Baylor Bears football team represented Baylor University (Waco, Texas) in the Southwest Conference (SWC) during the 1968 NCAA University Division football season. In their tenth and final season under head coach John Bridgers, the Bears compiled a 3–7 record (3–4 against conference opponents), finished in fifth place in the conference, and were outscored by opponents by a combined total of 322 to 206. They played their home games at Baylor Stadium in Waco, Texas.

The team's statistical leaders included Steve Stuart with 1,320 passing yards, Pinkie Palmer with 818 rushing yards, Jerry Smith with 509 receiving yards, and Gene Rogers and Pinkie Palmer with 36 points scored each. Jackie Allen and Pinkie Palmer were the team captains.

Schedule

Roster

References

Baylor
Baylor Bears football seasons
Baylor Bears football